Machir or Makir ( Māḵîr, "bartered") was the name of two figures in the Hebrew Bible:

 Machir was the son of Manasseh, grandson of Joseph, and father of Gilead. Joseph lived to see and to play a part in the up-bringing of Machir and his children. In the Torah's account of the journey of the Israelites after the Exodus, Machir (the individual) is portrayed as conquering the territories known as Gilead and Bashan, which had previously been occupied by Amorites. Half of the tribe of Manasseh, those descended from Machir, are described as having settled in Gilead and Bashan, and consequently they were important in Gilead's history.
 According to the Books of Samuel, Machir son of Ammiel was the name of a descendant of the Machir mentioned above, who resided at Lo-Debar. The text states that here he looked after Meribaal, the son of Jonathan, until David took over his care, and also looked after David himself, when David found himself a fugitive.

Further:
 Machir ben Yehudah Zakkai of Narbonne (725-765 c.e.), Babylonian-Jewish scholar and leader of the Jewish community of Narbonne
 Machir ben Abba Mari, author of Yalkut haMachiri (Hebrew: ילקוט המכירי)
 James Machir (died 1827), United States Representative from Virginia

See also
 Tribe of Manasseh
 Machir (Biblical region)

References

Founders of biblical tribes
Book of Genesis people
Gilead